Baltezers is a village in Ādaži Municipality in the historical region of Vidzeme, and the Riga Planning Region in Latvia.

History
Baltezers historically formed around Adazi-Bukultu Castle (Neuermühlen, 1287) as Baltezera-Bukultu  surrounding the parish church. In 1562, Gotthard Kettler appointed Heinrich von Don as the landlord.

References

Ādaži Municipality
Villages in Latvia